Colo is a stratovolcano in Indonesia. It forms the small island of Una-Una at the middle of the Gulf of Tomini, the northern part of Sulawesi. Only three eruptions have been recorded in the history with two of them causing damage.

1898 eruption
The eruption had a VEI of 3, qualifying as 'severe'. It involved:
Central vent eruption 
Crater lake eruption(?) 
Explosive eruption 
Lahars 
   
The island was evacuated, and there was damage to property.

1983 eruption
This eruption was more violent and had a VEI of 4. It involved: 

 Central vent eruption 
 Explosive eruption 
Pyroclastic flow(s) 
Phreatic explosion 

The island was evacuated, and there was damage to property, but there were no deaths.

See also 

 List of volcanoes in Indonesia

References 

Stratovolcanoes of Indonesia
Colo (volcano)
Mountains of Indonesia
Calderas of Indonesia
20th-century volcanic events
19th-century volcanic events